This is a list of presidents of the American Philological Association, which in 2013 changed its name to the Society for Classical Studies.

Presidents

References

Bibliography
 

American philologists
American Philological Association